The Puritans were a group of English Protestants in the 16th and 17th centuries. 

Puritan or The Puritan(s) may also refer to:

Art and entertainment
 The Puritan (Springfield, Massachusetts), a statue by August St. Gaudens

Literature
 The Puritans, an 1899 novel by Arlo Bates
 The Puritans, a 1947 novel by Guy McCrone
 The Puritans, an 1869 poetry collection by Ernest Myers

Music
 The Puritan (album), by Nightrage, 2015
 "The Puritan" (song), by Blur, 2012
 The Puritan, a doom-metal band with Albert Witchfinder, formerly of Reverend Bizarre
 Puritan Records, a 1920s American record label
 The Puritans (opera) or I puritani, an 1835 opera by Bellini

Theater and film
 The Puritan, a 1607 anonymous Jacobean stage comedy
 The Puritan (film), a 1938 French crime film
 The Puritans (film), a 2013 American short film

Places
 Puritan, Colorado, US
 Puritan, Ohio, US

Transport
 USS Puritan, several United States Navy ships
 Puritan (ACM-16), a U.S. Army Mine Planter 1951–1959
 Puritan (schooner), designed by John Alden and launched in 1931
 Puritan (yacht), the 1885 America's Cup defender
 Puritan, a passenger train of the New York, New Haven and Hartford Railroad

See also